A dealership management system (DMS) or auto dealership management system  is a bundled management information system created specifically for the automotive industry car dealerships or large equipment manufacturers, such as General Motors, Ford, Fiat Chrysler dealerships, and also adapted for cars, boats, bikes, RV, and power sports dealers. These systems contain software that meets the needs of the finance, sales, workshop, parts, inventory and administration components of running the dealership. 

One of their functions can be automating tax returns. Other more sophisticated features include online marketing tools and analytics on deals. Newer DMS systems have seen utilization of mobile platforms as well with or without additional software like ClearMechanic, from Clear. 

Examples of DMS systems used in the US are CDK Drive from CDK Global and ERA-IGNITE from Reynolds and Reynolds, also Get My Auto DMS used by independent car dealerships

References

See also
Customer relationship management

HOW TO CHOOSE YOUR DEALER MANAGEMENT SYSTEM?

Automotive industry
Auto dealerships
Business software
Management cybernetics